In mathematics, duality theory for distributive lattices  provides three different (but closely related) representations of bounded distributive lattices via Priestley spaces, spectral spaces, and pairwise Stone spaces. This duality, which is originally also due to Marshall H. Stone, generalizes the well-known Stone duality between Stone spaces and Boolean algebras.

For each , let .

In fact, each spectral space is homeomorphic to the prime spectrum of some bounded distributive lattice.

Moreover,  is a pairwise Stone space. Each pairwise Stone space is bi-homeomorphic to the bitopological dual of some bounded distributive lattice.

Then  is a Priestley space. Each Priestley space is isomorphic to the Priestley dual of some bounded distributive lattice.

Let Dist denote the category of bounded distributive lattices and bounded lattice homomorphisms. Then the above three representations of bounded distributive lattices can be extended to dual equivalence between Dist and the categories Spec, PStone, and  Pries of spectral spaces with spectral maps, of pairwise Stone spaces with bi-continuous maps, and of Priestley spaces with Priestley morphisms, respectively:

Thus, there are three equivalent ways of representing bounded distributive lattices. Each one has its own motivation and advantages, but ultimately they all serve the same purpose of providing better understanding of bounded distributive lattices.

See also
Representation theorem
Birkhoff's representation theorem
Stone's representation theorem for Boolean algebras
Stone duality
Esakia duality

Notes

References
 Priestley, H. A. (1970). Representation of distributive lattices by means of ordered Stone spaces. Bull. London Math. Soc., (2) 186–190.
 Priestley, H. A. (1972). Ordered topological spaces and the representation of distributive lattices. Proc. London Math. Soc.,  24(3) 507–530.
 Stone, M. (1938). Topological representation of distributive lattices and Brouwerian logics. Casopis Pest. Mat. Fys., 67 1–25.
 Cornish, W. H. (1975). On H. Priestley's dual of the category of bounded distributive lattices. Mat. Vesnik, 12(27) (4) 329–332.
 M. Hochster (1969). Prime ideal structure in commutative rings. Trans. Amer. Math. Soc., 142 43–60
 Johnstone, P. T. (1982). Stone spaces. Cambridge University Press, Cambridge. .
 Jung, A. and Moshier, M. A. (2006). On the bitopological nature of Stone duality. Technical Report CSR-06-13, School of Computer Science, University of Birmingham.
 Bezhanishvili, G., Bezhanishvili, N., Gabelaia, D., Kurz,  A. (2010). Bitopological duality for distributive lattices and Heyting algebras. Mathematical Structures in Computer Science'', 20.
 

Topology
Category theory
Lattice theory
Duality theories